The Board of Intermediate and Secondary Education, Dera Ghazi Khan is a government body located in the Chowk Sarwar Wali. The Board was established in 1989.

Jurisdiction 

The jurisdiction of DG Khan Board includes the following districts:
Dera Ghazi Khan
Muzaffargarh
Layyah
Rajanpur

See also 
 List of educational boards in Pakistan
 Federal Board of Intermediate and Secondary Education

External links

 Official Website of DG Khan Board

Dera Ghazi Khan